Robert Whitney may refer to:
Robert Whitney (conductor) (1904–1986), American conductor
Robert A. Whitney (born 1935), American veterinarian and acting Surgeon General
Robert Kenneth Whitney (1898–1983), Canadian First World War flying ace
Robert Whitney (MP for Thetford), English Member of Parliament (MP) for Thetford, 1584
Robert Whitney (died 1402), English MP for Herefordshire, 1377 to 1391
Robert Whitney (died 1443), English MP for Herefordshire, 1416, 1422
Robert Whitney (died 1567), English MP for Herefordshire, 1559

See also
Bob Whitney (disambiguation)